The Women's 69 kg weightlifting event at the 2006 Commonwealth Games took place at the Melbourne Exhibition Centre on 20 March 2006.

Schedule
All times are Australian Eastern Standard Time (UTC+10)

Records
Prior to this competition, the existing world, Commonwealth and Games records were as follows:

The following records were established during the competition:

Results

References

Weightlifting at the 2006 Commonwealth Games